The Cambria County Conservation and Recreation Authority was created in 1994  by the Cambria County Commissioners using the Municipal Authorities Act of 1945 to establish recreation opportunities as well as assist with cleanup of streams and rivers due to pollution from coal mining in the county. The authority is overseen by a fifteen-member board of directors, made up of residents throughout Cambria County.

Projects
CCCRA has conducted several conservation and recreation projects, as well as partnered with several other agencies since its incorporation, including

Recreation Projects
 Ghost Town Trail
 Rock Run Recreation Area
 Path of the Flood Trail
 James Mayer Riverswalk Trail

Conservation Projects
 Bear Rock Run AMD Remediation, Washington Township
 Gray Run AMD Remediation, Lower Yoder Township
 Sulfur Creek AMD Remediation, Adams Township
 Webster Mine Remediation, Nanty Glo Borough
 Barnes/Watkins Coal Refuse Pile Remediation, Barr Township

See also
 List of municipal authorities in Cambria County, Pennsylvania

References

Government of Cambria County, Pennsylvania
1994 establishments in Pennsylvania